Joseph Rogers is a former all-star and award-winning Canadian Football League wide receiver.

After playing college football at Texas Southern Rogers had an all-star rookie season in 1996 with the Ottawa Rough Riders. His 73 catches, 1259 yards and 8 touchdowns won him the Frank M. Gibson Trophy as best rookie in the CFL East. He never lived up to this performance over the next 3 seasons, playing for the Winnipeg Blue Bombers, Calgary Stampeders, Edmonton Eskimos and Winnipeg again, eventually retiring after 1999.

References

1971 births
Living people
African-American players of Canadian football
Calgary Stampeders players
Canadian Football League Rookie of the Year Award winners
Edmonton Elks players
Ottawa Rough Riders players
Winnipeg Blue Bombers players
21st-century African-American sportspeople
20th-century African-American sportspeople